"Kimi ga Koko ni ite Hoshī" (君がここにいてほしい) is the 9th single by Kiyotaka Sugiyama, released on October 21, 1989, by VAP. The song charted on the Oricon charts at No. 12.

The song would be the last song released by VAP as he would transfer to Warner Music Japan the next year with his next single, "Itsumo Kimi o Omotteru." The song would be used as the theme song for Naruhodo! The World while its B-Side, "Inside Colors," would be used for Central Japan Railway Company's Autumn Kyoto Campaign commercials.

Track listing

Charts

References 

J-pop songs
1989 songs
1989 singles